Later That Day (stylized as Later That Day...) is the debut solo studio album by Lyrics Born. It was released on Quannum Projects in 2003. It peaked at number 40 on the Billboard Independent Albums chart.

Critical reception

Spence D. of IGN gave the album a 9.0 out of 10, saying, "this is much more than a standard rap/hip-hop album, being more in tune with the bugged out aural manifestations of George Clinton and Frank Zappa than anything else." Barry Walters of Rolling Stone gave the album 3.5 stars out of 5, calling it "the rare hip-hop album that's as free and fun as it is tight."

Track listing

Charts

References

External links
 
 Christgau, Robert (October 2003). "Spellbinder". The Village Voice.

2003 debut albums
Lyrics Born albums
Quannum Projects albums